Valentina Marcucci (born 21 February 1998) is an Argentinian field hockey player.

Hockey career 
In 2021, Marcucci was called into the senior national women's team.

References

Living people
1998 births
Argentine female field hockey players
Field hockey players from Buenos Aires
Competitors at the 2022 South American Games
South American Games silver medalists for Argentina
South American Games medalists in field hockey
21st-century Argentine women